Karl Menger (January 13, 1902 – October 5, 1985) was an Austrian-American mathematician, the son of the economist Carl Menger. In mathematics, Menger studied the theory of algebras and the dimension theory of low-regularity ("rough") curves and regions; in graph theory, he is credited with Menger's theorem.  Outside of mathematics, Menger has substantial contributions to game theory and social sciences.

Biography
Karl Menger was a student of Hans Hahn and received his PhD from the University of Vienna in 1924. L. E. J. Brouwer invited Menger in 1925 to teach at the University of Amsterdam. In 1927, he returned to Vienna to accept a professorship there. In 1930 and 1931 he was visiting lecturer at Harvard University and the Rice Institute. From 1937 to 1946 he was a professor at the University of Notre Dame.  From 1946 to 1971, he was a professor at Illinois Institute of Technology (IIT) in Chicago. In 1983, IIT awarded Menger a Doctor of Humane Letters and Sciences degree.

Contributions to mathematics

His most famous popular contribution was the Menger sponge (mistakenly known as Sierpinski's sponge), a three-dimensional version of the Sierpiński carpet. It is also related to the Cantor set.

With Arthur Cayley, Menger is considered one of the founders of distance geometry; especially by having formalized definitions of the notions of angle and of curvature in terms of directly measurable physical quantities, namely ratios of distance values. The characteristic mathematical expressions appearing in those definitions are Cayley–Menger determinants.

He was an active participant of the Vienna Circle, which had discussions in the 1920s on social science and philosophy. During that time, he published an influential result on the St. Petersburg paradox with applications to the utility theory in economics; this result has since been criticised as fundamentally misleading. Later he contributed to the development of game theory with Oskar Morgenstern.

Legacy
Menger's longest and last academic post was at the Illinois Institute of Technology, which hosts an annual IIT Karl Menger Lecture and offers the IIT Karl Menger Student Award to an exceptional student for scholarship each year.

See also
 Distance geometry
 Kuratowski's theorem
 Selection principle
 Travelling salesman problem

Notes

Further reading
Crilly, Tony, 2005, "Paul Urysohn and Karl Menger: papers on dimension theory" in Grattan-Guinness, I., ed., Landmark Writings in Western Mathematics. Elsevier: 844–55.
 Golland, Louise and Sigmund, Karl  "Exact Thought in a Demented Time: Karl Menger and his Viennese Mathematical Colloquium" The Mathematical Intelligencer 2000, Vol 22,1, 34-45

External links 
 
 

1902 births
1985 deaths
20th-century American mathematicians
Austrian mathematicians
Vienna Circle
Harvard University staff
Rice University staff
Duke University faculty
University of Notre Dame faculty
Illinois Institute of Technology faculty
Austrian emigrants to the United States
University of Vienna alumni
Scientists from Vienna